Warbstow Bury is an Iron Age hillfort about  west of the village of Warbstow, in Cornwall, England. It is a scheduled monument.

Location and description
There are views to Lundy Island and Dartmoor.

The fort is one of the largest earthworks in Cornwall. Between these, in the southern part, are the remains of an earlier rampart.

The inner rampart has two original entrances, inturned and facing each other, on the north-west and south-east, and there are corresponding simple entrances in the outer rampart.

Pillow mound

It is known as "The Giant's Grave" or "King Arthur's Grave".

See also

 Hillforts in Britain

References

External links
Warbstow Bury: Re-writing the Story of a Cornish Hillfort Heritage Calling: A Historic England Blog

Hill forts in Cornwall
Scheduled monuments in Cornwall